Asturias, or Principality of Asturias, is an autonomous community of Spain.

Asturias may also refer to:

Places
Kingdom of Asturias, established in the early 8th century by King Pelagius of Asturias
Asturias, Cebu, a municipality in the Philippines
Parque Asturias, a defunct stadium in Mexico City

Ships
RMS Asturias, a Royal Mail Steam Packet Company passenger liner launched in 1907 and scrapped in 1933
, a Royal Mail Steam Packet Company passenger liner launched in 1925 and scrapped in 1957
, launched in 1972 and decommissioned in 2009
, launched in 1982 and decommissioned in 2013

People
Asturias (surname)

Organizations
 Asturias Forum, a political party in Spain
 Asturias Guitar Manufacturing Ltd, a Japanese maker of classical and acoustic guitars and ukeleles

Culture and sports
 Asturias autonomous football team, a regional football team for Asturias in Spain
 Asturias (sculpture), a work of art outside Oviedo railway station
 Asturias F.C., a former Mexican football team
 Duchy of Asturia, a fictional duchy from David Eddings' Belgariad and related works
 Asturias (Leyenda), a musical work by the Spanish composer and pianist Isaac Albéniz